Oksana Viktorovna Romenskaya (6 June 1976 in Rostov-on-Don) is a Russian team handball player, playing on the Russian women's national handball team. She won gold medal with the Russian winning team in the 2007 World Women's Handball Championship.

References

External links

Russian female handball players
Handball players at the 2008 Summer Olympics
Olympic handball players of Russia
Olympic silver medalists for Russia
Sportspeople from Rostov-on-Don
Living people
Olympic medalists in handball
1976 births
Medalists at the 2008 Summer Olympics
20th-century Russian women